Patchitt is a surname. Notable people with the surname include:

 Basil Patchitt (1900–1991), British footballer
 Edwin Patchitt (1808–1888), British cricketer

See also
 Patchett